Lake Bario is one of a chain of lakes into which the Awash River empties its waters. It is located at the eastern end of the Afar Region of Ethiopia.
Lake Bario lies in the middle of a swamp, through which it receives its inflow from Lake Afambo to the northeast. Its outflow is on its southern side, which circles around Mount Dama Ali to empty into Lake Abbe.

References

Afar Region
Awash River
Lakes of Ethiopia
Lakes of the Great Rift Valley